Llanfihangel-y-Pennant is a hamlet and wider, very sparsely populated community (which includes Abergynolwyn and Tal-y-llyn) in the Meirionnydd area of Gwynedd in Wales.  It is located in the foothills of Cadair Idris, and has a population of 402, reducing to 339 at the 2011 Census.

Nearby is the ruined castle of Castell y Bere, a stronghold of the Welsh princes of Gwynedd in the 13th century.

History
In 1800, Mary Jones walked  from the village to Bala to buy a Welsh Bible. This led to the formation of the British and Foreign Bible Society.
Mary Jones World, a heritage centre about her life is located near Bala.

References

External links

Official website for St Michael's, Llanfihangel-y-Pennant
Geograph : Photographs of Llanfihangel-y-Pennant and Abergynolwyn

 
Villages in Gwynedd
Communities in Gwynedd